The Wisconsin State Assembly elections of 2018 were held on Tuesday, November 6, 2018. All 99 seats in the Wisconsin State Assembly were up for election. The Republican Party maintained a majority it has held since 2011, winning 63 seats, a loss of one seat, and 44.75% of the voting share. Despite winning a majority of ballots cast, the Democratic Party won only 36 seats, thus remaining a minority and gaining just one seat from the Republicans, district 14. Democratic votes were concentrated in urban areas such as Milwaukee and Madison, while Republicans garnered votes in more rural areas, which has been widely attributed to the impact of gerrymandering in the post-2010 state redistricting. Based on the 2018 results, the tipping point district was District 29, which the Republicans won by a margin of 12.12%, therefore Democrats would have needed to win the statewide popular vote by a margin of 20.36% to win a majority of seats.

Results

Results by district

See also
 2018 Wisconsin gubernatorial election
 2018 Wisconsin State Senate election
 2018 Wisconsin elections

References

External links
 Wisconsin Elections Commission

Wisconsin State Assembly
State Assembly
2018